Santa Catarina Lachatao  is a town and municipality in Oaxaca in south-western Mexico. It is part of the Ixtlán District in the Sierra Norte region.

References

External links 

Municipalities of Oaxaca